The horseshoe arch, also called the Moorish arch and the keyhole arch, is a type of arch in which the circular curve is continued below the horizontal line of its diameter, so that the opening at the bottom of the arch is narrower than the arch's full span. Evidence for the earliest uses of this form are found in Late Antique and Sasanian architecture, but it became emblematic of Islamic architecture, especially Moorish architecture. It also made later appearances in Moorish Revival and Art Nouveau styles. Horseshoe arches can take rounded, pointed or lobed form.

History

Origins and early uses 

The origins of the horseshoe arch are controversial. It appeared in pre-Islamic Sasanian architecture such as the Taq-i Kasra in present-day Iraq and the Palace of Ardashir in southwestern Iran (3rd century CE). It also appeared in Late Roman or Byzantine architecture, as well as in Roman Spain. In Byzantine Syria, the form was used in the Baptistery of Saint Jacob at Nusaybin (4th century CE) and in Qasr Ibn Wardan (564 CE). Evidence of its use is also found in early Christian architecture in Byzantine Anatolia and became characteristic of Christian architecture in Cappadocia, though the origins of this regional feature are sometimes debated. An early example of its use in Anatolia is found at the Alahan Monastery in present-day southern Turkey. In Visigothic Spain, horseshoe arches are found, for example, in of the Church of Santa Eulalia de Boveda near Lugo and the Church of Santa Maria de Melque near Toledo. Some tombstones from that period have been found in the north of Spain with horseshoe arches in them, eliciting speculation about a pre-Roman local Celtic tradition.In early Islamic architecture, some horseshoe arches appeared in Umayyad architecture of the 7th to 8th centuries. They are found in the Umayyad Mosque of Damascus, though their horseshoe shape is not very pronounced. They are also found in the Umayyad Palace at the Amman Citadel in present-day Jordan. 

According to Giovanni Teresio Rivoira, an archeologist writing in the early 20th century, the pointed variant of the horseshoe arch is of Islamic origin. According to Rivoira, this type of arch was first used in the Ibn Tulun Mosque, completed in 879. Wijdan Ali also describes this as the first systematic use of the pointed variant. Horseshoe arches of a slightly pointed form were also used in Aghlabid architecture of the 9th century, including the Great Mosque of Kairouan (circa 836) and the Mosque of Ibn Khayrun (866).

Development in the Iberian Peninsula and the Maghreb 
It was in Al-Andalus (on the Iberian Peninsula) and western North Africa (the Maghreb) that horseshoe arches developed their characteristic form. Prior to the Muslim invasion of Spain, the Visigoths of the Iberian Peninsula used them in their architecture. Although it is possible that Andalusi architecture borrowed the horseshoe arch from Umayyad Syria, these local precedents make it just as likely that it developed locally instead. The "Moorish" arch, however, was of a slightly different and more sophisticated form than the Visigothic arch, being less flat and more circular.The Umayyads of Al-Andalus, starting with the Emirate period, used horseshoe arches prominently and ubiquitously, often enclosing them in an alfiz (rectangular frame) to accentuate the effect of its shape. This can be seen at a large scale in their major work, the Great Mosque of Córdoba. Its most distinctive form, however, was consolidated in the 10th-century during the Caliphal period, as seen at Madinat al-Zahra, where the arches consist of about three quarters of a circle and are framed in an alfiz. The Córdoban style of horseshoe arch spread all over the Caliphate and adjacent areas, and was adopted by the successor Muslim emirates of the peninsula, the taifas, as well as by the architecture of the Maghreb under subsequent dynasties. Its use remained especially consistent in the form of mosque mihrabs.

In the northern Iberian Peninsula, where Asturias and other Christian kingdoms ruled, the use of horseshoe arches continued under the influence of previous Visigothic architecture and of contemporary Islamic architecture. The addition of an alfiz around horseshoe arches was one detail more specifically borrowed from Islamic styles. Starting in the 9th century, some Mozarabs (Christians living under Muslim rule) left al-Andalus and settled in the northern Christian territories, where they contributed to popularizing this form locally, as exemplified by San Miguel de Escalada (10th century). The Mozarabs also incorporated horseshoe arches into their art, such as in illuminated manuscripts.  

Under the Almoravids (11th-12th centuries), the first pointed horseshoe arches began to appear in the region and then became more widespread during the Almohad period (12th-13th centuries). This pointed horseshoe arch is likely of North African origin. Art historian Georges Marçais attributed it in particular to Ifriqiya (present-day Tunisia), where it was present in earlier Aghlabid and Fatimid architecture.   

As Muslim rule retreated in Al-Andalus, the Mudéjar style, which developed from the 12th to the 16th centuries under Spanish Christian rule, continued the tradition of horseshoe arches in the Iberian Peninsula. Horseshoe arches also continued to be used in the Maghreb, in the architecture of Morocco, Algeria, and Tunisia.

Use in other parts of the Islamic world 

Horseshoe arches were also common in Ghurid and Ghaznavid architecture (11th-13th centuries) in Central Asia, though in this region they had sharp pointed apexes, in contrast with those of the western Islamic world. Sometimes they were cusped or given multifoil flourishes. Around the same time or not long afterward, they begin to appear as far east as India, in Indo-Islamic architecture, such as in the Alai Darwaza gatehouse (dating from 1311) at the Qutb Complex in Delhi, though they were not a consistent feature in India. 

Some pointed arches with a slightly horseshoe shape appear in Ayyubid architecture in Syria. It appears, exceptionally, in some instances of Mamluk architecture. For example, it appears in some details of the Sultan Qalawun Complex in Cairo, built in 1285. Andalusi-style horseshoe arches are also found alongside the minaret of the Mosque of Ibn Tulun in Cairo, probably dating from 13th-century renovations ordered by Sultan Lajin to the older 9th-century mosque.

Use in Moorish revival architecture 

In addition to their use across the Islamic world, horseshoe arches became popular in Western countries in Moorish Revival architecture, which became fashionable in the 19th century. They were widely used in Moorish Revival synagogues. They were employed in the Neo-Mudéjar style in Spain, another type of Moorish Revival style. They are used in some forms of Indo-Saracenic Revival architecture, a 19th-century style associated with the British Raj.

Use in Art Nouveau 

Exaggerated horseshoe arches were also popular in some forms of Art Nouveau architecture, notably in Brussels. Among other examples, this can be seen on the street façade of the Cauchie House.

Notes

References

Arches and vaults
Islamic architectural elements